The Forde ministry (Labor) was the 31st ministry of the Government of Australia. It was led by the country's 15th Prime Minister, Frank Forde. The Forde Ministry succeeded the Second Curtin ministry, which dissolved on 6 July 1945 following the death of former Prime Minister John Curtin - the second of three occasions where a sitting Prime Minister died in office. Since Forde was the deputy Labor leader, it was a caretaker ministry until the Labor caucus could elect a new leader. Treasurer Ben Chifley was ultimately elected over Forde on 12 July 1945, and he was sworn in as Prime Minister along with his ministry the following day.

Frank Forde, who died in 1983, was the last surviving member of the Forde Ministry; Forde was also the last surviving minister of the Scullin government, the Curtin government, and the First Chifley ministry.

Ministry

References

Ministries of George VI
Forde, 1
Australian Labor Party ministries
1945 establishments in Australia
1945 disestablishments in Australia
Cabinets established in 1945
Cabinets disestablished in 1945